The Holcad is the official student newspaper of Westminster College in New Wilmington, Pennsylvania.  It is published every Friday during the academic year except the Fridays immediately before or after breaks and during finals.

The Holcad was started in 1884, 32 years after the establishment of the college.  It has been published every year since without interruption.

It is printed by West Penn Printing in New Castle, Pennsylvania under the advisement of The Herald of Sharon, Pennsylvania. Formerly of the tabloid format, it has been printed in broadsheet format since 2004.

Sections
The Holcad is split into a number of sections.

Campus News - contains news from around campus
Opinion - contains Rant & Raves and a comic weekly, with editorials and columns from staff and letters to the editor.
Sports - contains sports news
A&E - contains reviews and upcoming concert/movie information
Features - contains human interest stories and columns

Recent events

Hit List Theft
More than 1,500 copies of the March 3, 2006 edition were stolen from newsstands. The edition contained a story and editorial about and pictures of a hit list that a student made and posted in his dorm room. The hit list was found by his roommate and reported to school authorities, who the students felt reacted unfavorably. The information was brought to The Holcad and published.

On the morning of March 3, staff members discovered that more than half of the double run—the editors had been warned by an administrator that the edition might be stolen, so they ordered more copies—was stolen.

A few weeks later, as March 3 was the Friday before a break, a member of the Sierra Student Coalition found more than 200 copies in a newspaper recycling bin in the McKelvey Campus Center.

The Holcad was told that a student was "going through the judicial process" but it never officially learned the student's identity.

References

External links
The Holcad
Student Press Law Center coverage of Hit List Theft

Student newspapers published in Pennsylvania
Westminster College (Pennsylvania)
1884 establishments in Pennsylvania
Publications established in 1884